Magliocca is a surname. Notable people with the surname include:

Gerard Magliocca (born 1973), American law professor
Joe Magliocca, Canadian politician

See also
Magliocco

References

Italian-language surnames